Gaelic warfare was the type of warfare practiced by the Gaelic peoples (the Irish, Scottish, and Manx), in the pre-modern period.

Indigenous Gaelic Warfare

Weaponry
Irish warfare was for centuries centered on the Ceithearn, or Kern in English (and so pronounced in Gaelic), light skirmishing infantry who harried the enemy with missiles before charging. John Dymmok, serving under Elizabeth I's lord-lieutenant of Ireland, described the kerns as:

"... A kind of footman, slightly armed with a sword, a target (round shield) of wood, or a bow and sheaf of arrows with barbed heads, or else three darts, which they cast with a wonderful facility and nearness..."

For centuries the backbone of any Gaelic Irish army were these lightly armed foot soldiers. Ceithearn were usually armed with a spear (gae) or sword (claideamh), long dagger (scian), bow (bogha) and a set of javelins, or darts (gá-ín). 

The use of armored infantry in Gaelic Ireland from the 9th century on, came as a counter to the mail-clad Vikings. The arrival of the heavily armored Norse-Gaelic mercenary Gallowglasses in the early 13th century, was in response to the Norman invasion of Ireland and the Anglo-Normans use of heavily armored Men-at-arms and Knights.

These adaptations and developments brought regular use of other weapons such as lances, poleaxes like the dane axe, lochaber axe, sparth axe and swords like the arming sword and two-handed swords similar to the Scottish Claymore. 
Many of the medieval swords found in Ireland today are unlikely to be of native manufacture given many of the pommels and cross-guard decoration is not of Gaelic origin.

By the time of Brian Bóruma and Máel Sechnaill, Irish kings were taking large armies on campaign over long distances and using naval forces in tandem with land forces. From the 11th century on, kings maintained small permanent fighting forces known as lucht tighe "troops of the household", who were often given houses and land on the king's mensal land. These were well-trained and equipped professional soldiers made up of infantry and cavalry. 

Aside from Hobelars, who were highly mobile, lightly armored, cavalry skirmishers and archers, used primarily for scouting and ambushes, the main Gaelic cavalry was usually made up of a king or chieftain and his clan. They usually rode without saddles but wore armor and iron helmets and wielded swords, skenes and long spears or lances. A fully outfitted medieval Irish army would have included light infantry, heavy infantry and mixed cavalry.

Gaelic Warfare was anything but stagnant and was adaptive and ever changing. By the time of the Tudor reconquest of Ireland and the beginning of the end of the Gaelic era, the Irish had adopted continental "pike and shot" formations like those used by the continental armies of the Spanish, Swiss and Germans. With formations consisting of pikemen mixed with musketeers and swordsmen. Indeed, from 1593 to 1601, the Gaelic Irish fought with the most up-to-date methods of warfare, including full reliance on firearms and modern military tactics.

Gaelic raid culture

The Gaelic Irish preferred hit-and-run tactics and shock tactics like ambushes and raids (the crech), which involved catching the enemy unaware. One of the most common causes of conflict in Gaelic Ireland was cattle raiding. Cattle were the main form of wealth in Gaelic Ireland, as it was in many parts of Europe, as currency had not yet been introduced, and the aim of most wars was the capture of the enemy's cattle. If this worked, the raiders would then seize any valuables (mainly livestock) and potentially valuable hostages, burn the crops, and escape. 

Indeed, cattle raiding was a social institution within Gaelic culture and newly crowned kings would carry out raids on traditional rivals upon coronation. The Gaelic term creach rígh, or "king's raid", was used to describe the event, implying it was a customary tradition. 

The cattle raid was often called a Táin Bó and was an important aspect of Gaelic literature and culture, with the Táin Bó Cúailnge and Táin Bó Flidhais as important examples. 
Gaelic warfare was anything but static, as Gaelic soldiers frequently looted or bought the newest and most effective weaponry. 
Although hit-and-run raiding was the preferred Gaelic tactic in medieval times, there were also pitched battles to settle larger disputes. 

Especially following the arrival of the Vikings from Lochlann, who brought their own style of warfare, raiding and settlements. Over time these newcomers founded their own kingdom, began a dynastic line and developed a distinct culture of their own.

Armor

For the most part, the Gaelic Irish fought without armor, instead wearing saffron coloured belted tunics called léine (pronounced 'laynuh'), the plural being léinte (pronounced 'layntuh/laynchuh'). According to Gerald of Wales (in the early 12th century), the Gaels preferred to not wear armor, as they deemed it burdensome to wear and one to be "brave and honourable" to fight without it. Armor was usually a simple affair: the poorest might have worn padded coats, the wealthier might have worn boiled leather armor called cuir bouilli, and the wealthiest might have had access to bronze chest plates, padded textile armor or maybe perhaps mail or scale armors (though they did exist in Ireland, they were quite rare). Gallowglass mercenaries of the early 13th century have been depicted as having worn mail tunics and steel burgonet helmets but the overall majority of Gaelic warriors would have been protected only by a small shield. Gaelic shields were usually round, with a spindle shaped boss, though later the regular iron boss models were introduced by the Anglo-Saxons, Vikings and Normans. A few shields were also oval in shape or square, but most of the native shields were small and round, like bucklers, to better enable agility and a quick escape.

Customs

Clan warfare was an important aspect of life in Gaelic Ireland, especially before the Viking age. When Vikings brought new forms of technology, culture, warfare and settlements to Ireland. 

Before the Viking Age, there was a heavy importance placed on Gaelic clan wars and ritual combat. 
Another very important aspect of Gaelic ritual warfare at this time was single combat. In order to settle a dispute or merely to measure one's prowess, it was customary to challenge another individual warrior from the other army to ritual single combat to the death, while being cheered on by the opposing hosts. 

Champion warfare was an important aspect of Irish mythology, literature and culture, particularly in the Ulster cycle with Cú Chulainn and the Táin Bó Cúailnge, where the hero from Ulster defeats an entire army from Connacht one by one. Such single combats were common before a pitched battle, and for ritual purposes they tended to occur at river fords. 

The spirit and traditions of single combat would live on and manifest itself in other ways in Modern Gaelic cultures. 
In Scotland with events like Scottish Wrestling, the Highland Games and Scottish Martial Arts like the dueling of the 18th century. Where the victor was determined by who made the first-cut. However, this was not always observed, and at times the duel would continue to the death. 
In Ireland, the spirit of ritual combat has also manifested itself as single combat style sporting events and Irish martial arts such as Irish boxing (Dornálaíocht), Irish wrestling (Barróg), stick fighting (Bataireacht) and scuffling (Coiléar agus Uille).

Urban Defense 

Many of the towns in Gaelic Ireland had some type of defense in the form of walls or ditches. For most of the Gaelic period, dwellings and buildings were circular with conical thatched roofs. Many towns and dwellings in Gaelic Ireland were often surrounded by a circular rampart called a "ringfort". There were very few nucleated settlements, but after the 5th century some monasteries became the heart of small "monastic towns", many of the Irish round towers were built after this period.

Following the Norman invasion of Ireland, the Normans built motte-and-bailey castles in the areas they occupied, some of which were converted from ringforts. Within Gaelic Ireland, many of the areas conquered by Anglo-Normans often had defense walls due to the frontier type of lifestyle. Some had these walls built assuming that the town had no adequate defense with only using a ditch. The masonry walls on some towns had not been completed due to the economics of the time. While many of the towns often constructed what looks to be a defensive walls, this can sometimes not be the case. Towns constructed walls and town gates at times as merely a symbol of lordly wealth; or as a physical expression of power, the defensive aspects of some of these walls and gates would become a secondary role.

By the 12th century, "some mottes, especially in frontier areas, had almost certainly been built by the Gaelic Irish in imitation" of the Normans.
The Hiberno-Normans gradually replaced these wooden motte-and-baileys with stone castles and tower houses. Square and rectangle-shaped buildings gradually became more common, and by the 14th or 15th century they had replaced round buildings completely.

Starting in the late 16th century, an era of Siege warfare began in Ireland. During this period, urban defense came to the forefront of Gaelic warfare and became increasingly important. Following shocking atrocities at the Sack of Cashel and Oliver Cromwell’s Siege and massacre at Drogheda. Gaelic Irish rebels, realizing that they could not expect or trust any quarter to be given upon surrender, began to improvise and set traps for armies besieging their towns. 

At both the Siege of Clonmel and Siege of Charlemont, Irish rebel defenders were able exact a heavy toll on English forces. During Clonmel, Cromwell's New Model Army and 8,000 men eventually took the town from its 2,000 Irish defenders, but not before suffering heavy losses of around 2,000 soldiers or a quarter of their total force, their largest ever loss in a single action. At Charlemont, a small force of less than 200 defenders and townsfolk was able to hold off the New Model Army for two months through heavy fighting after arming the entire town's populace including women.  In both engagements, the English, with overwhelming forces, surrounded the fortifications and created a breach in the defenses using cannon fire and then assaulted the breach. Both times, the town’s people and defenders set a trap within. At Clonmel, they built a coupure within the breach and lined it with artillery, muskets, and pikemen, thus creating a killing field just inside the walls. In both instances, Irish defenders were able to compel the superior English forces into granting surrender agreements with generous terms through heavy fighting and attrition to the besieging armies.

Tactics and organisation

Initially Kern or ceithern were members of individual tribes, but later, when the Vikings and English came to Ireland, they introduced new systems of billeting soldiers, the kern became billeted soldiers and mercenaries who served the highest bidder. Because Kern were equipped and trained as light skirmishers, they faced a severe disadvantage in pitched battle. In battle, the kern and lightly armed horsemen would charge the enemy line after intimidating them with shock tactics, war cries, horns and pipes.

If the kern failed to break an enemy line after the charge, they were liable to flee. If the enemy formation did not break under the kern's charge, then heavily armed and armored Irish soldiers were moved forward and would advance from the rear lines and attack, these units were replaced in the late 13th century by the Gallowglass or Gallóglaigh, who at first were Norse-Gaelic mercenaries but by the 15th century most large túatha in Ireland had fostered and developed their own hereditary forces of Gallowglass. The primary function of Gaelic Heavy infantry was so lighter combatants such as Kern and Hobelars caught in thick fighting could strike, break free, re-group and tactically retreat behind the newly formed battle line if they needed to.

By the time of the Tudor reconquest of Ireland, the forces under Hugh O'Neill, Earl of Tyrone had adopted Continental pike-and-shot tactics. Indeed, from the 16th century on, the Gaelic Irish fought with the most up-to-date methods of warfare, including full reliance on firearms and modern tactics. Their formations consisted of a mix of Pikemen, musketeers and Gaelic swordsmen who began to be equipped and fight more like the continental units like the German Landsknecht or the Spanish Rodelero. They used these tactics to fight the invading English forces, however these formations proved vulnerable without adequate cavalry support. Muskets and other Firearms  were widely used in combination with traditional Gaelic shock and hit and run tactics, often in ambushes against enemy columns on the march.

Adaptations

As time went on, the Gaels began intensifying their raids and colonies in Roman Britain (c. 200–500 AD). Naval forces were necessary for this, and, as a result, large numbers of small boats, called currachs, were employed. Gaelic forces were so frequently at sea (especially the Dál Riata Gaels), weaponry had to change. Javelins and slings became more uncommon, as they required too much space to launch, which the small currachs did not allow. Instead, more and more Gaels were armed with bows and arrows.

The Dál Riata, for example, after colonizing the west of Scotland and becoming a maritime power, became an army composed completely of archers. Slings also went out of use, replaced by both bows and a very effective naval weapon called the crann tabhaill, a kind of catapult.

Later, when the Gaels came into contact with the Vikings, they realized the need for heavier weaponry, so as to make hacking through the much larger Norse shields and heavy mail-coats possible.

Heavier hacking-swords and polearm weapons became more frequent, as did Iron helmets and mail-coats. Gaels began to regularly use the double-handed "Dane Axe", wielded by the Vikings. Irish and Scottish infantry troops fighting with the Claymore, axes and heavier armor, in addition to their own native darts and bows.

The coming of the Normans into Ireland and Britain several hundred years later also forced the Irish and Scots to use an increasingly large number of more heavily armored warriors combined quick skirmisher cavalry in order to effectively deal with the mail-clad Normans.

During the Scottish Wars of Independence, the Scots had to develop a means to counter the Anglo-Norman English and their devastating combined use of heavy cavalry and the Longbow. Which had dominated almost every battlefield in Great Britain since Hastings.

The Scottish rebels Andrew de Moray, William Wallace and Scottish King Robert the Bruce can all be credited with the development of the Schiltron as a counter to the Normans and their early use of combined arms warfare. English Chroniclers of the era said of the warriors in the Schiltrons:

"They were all on foot; picked men they were, enthusiastic, armed with keen axes, and other weapons, and with their shields closely locked in front of them, they formed an impenetrable phalanx ..."
 "They had axes at their sides and lances in their hands. They advanced like a thick-set hedge and such a phalanx could not easily be broken."

Andrew de Moray is credited with using the Schiltron early on in the campaign but he died shortly after sustaining a mortal injury at the Battle of Stirling Bridge.

In early engagements, like when Schiltrons were used by William Wallace at the Battle of Falkirk, the immobile Phalanx-like formations proved vulnerable to the English Longbowmen without adequate cavalry support. But the Scots learned from this and by the time Edward II met the Scots at Bannockburn, Robert the Bruce had adapted the Schiltron and turned it into a more mobile offensive formation (much like the later Pike Square of continental fame). With these tight mobile formations and adequate cavalry support. The Scots were able to use this innovative adaptation to pin the English heavy horse against the Bannockburn on the second day of the Battle of Bannockburn and routed the army of Edward II of England paving the way for eventual Scottish Independence.

Standards and Music

Many Gaelic clans each had their own distinct cultures, symbols, heraldry, flags and battle standards. Wind instruments such as hollowed-out bull horns were often carried into battle by Chieftains or War leaders and used as a means to rally men into combat. Bagpipes would eventually gain popularity among Gaelic clans and replaced other rallying instruments such as the blowing horn or carnyx, it can be attributed as being used from as early on as the 14th century. Most notably the Great Irish Warpipes which would go on to be used by Gaelic mercenaries in European conflicts and would eventually develop into ceremonial instruments. Bagpipes have since become an important symbol of Gaelic culture as a whole. With both the Uilleann pipes and the Great Highland Bagpipe playing important roles in the culture of their respective nations.

Exported Gaelic Warfare

Gallowglass

The most prolific Norse legacy in Gaelic warfare was the introduction of the Gallowglass,  gallóglaigh (Irish) or gallòglaich (Scottish Gaelic), a kind of heavy infantry, shock troop and elite bodyguard for the Gaelic Nobility. Similar in function to the Housecarls of the English nobility or the Varangian Guard of Constantinople. The original Gallowglass were Norse–Gaelic mercenaries who came from the Hebrides and the Isles. They appeared in Ireland in the 13th century, following the Wars of Scottish Independence and the Bruce campaign but by the 15th century most large túatha had their own hereditary force of Gallowglass. They fought and trained in a combination of Gaelic and Norse techniques, and were highly valued; they were hired throughout the British Isles at different times, though most famously in Ireland.

One of the first battles believed to have to included Gallowglass was the Battle of Connacht. As Áed na nGall Ó Conchobair, the King of Connacht who defeated the Anglo-Normans, was known to travel with a retinue of 160 Gallowglass that he received as a dowry. Gallowglass usually wore mail and iron helmets and wielded heavy weaponry such as the Dane axe, Sparth axes, Lochaber axes, Longswords, Claymores and sometimes spears or lances. These Gallóglaigh furnished the retreating Gaels with a "moving line of defense from which the horsemen could make short, sharp charges, and behind which they could retreat when pursued". Their heavy armor made them less nimble than kern, so they were sometimes placed at strategic spots along the line of retreat.

Gallowglasses were frequently hired and served as mercenaries in continental armies and units, such as the Dutch Blue Guards, Swiss Guard, the French Scottish Guard, and the forces of King Gustavus Adolphus of Sweden in his invasion of Livonia during the Thirty Years' War. Gallowglass later became a caste of warrior rather than a indicator of a norse gaelic origin, with Irish Gallowglass clans producing their own.

Despite the increased usage of firearms in Irish warfare following the 16th century, Gallowglass remained an integral part of Hugh Ó Neill's forces during the Nine Years' War. Following the combined Irish defeat at the Battle of Kinsale in 1601, the recruitment of the heavily armored warriors finally waned.

Hobelars

Hobelars were a mounted, highly mobile skirmisher unit. Some were mounted archers, some were merely light cavalry. These Gaelic horsemen were utilitarian and could fill multiple roles on the battlefield, including as mobile skirmisher infantry used to outmaneuver enemy units or that of skirmisher cavalry, used for quick and abrupt attacks.

Early Hobelars wore little armor, they typically rode on smaller quicker unarmored hobby horses and ponies rather than the full sized horses that Men-at-arms rode. Hobelars would typically dismount to fight, harry their opponents and then utilize their mounts as a quick getaway. As time went on, Hobelars began to be utilized for more and more cavalry tasks and functions.

During his conflicts with the English crown, Robert the Bruce deployed the hobby for his campaign of guerilla warfare and mounted raids to great success, covering 60 to 70 miles (100 to 110 km) a day. They were so successful that Edward I of England prevented Irish exports of hobbies to Scotland in order to gain an advantage in the conflict. 
Hobelars were highly proficient at scouting, patrolling and ambushing in areas typically unreachable by cavalry units such a mountainous areas, thick forests and boggy swamps. Within Ireland and Great Britain and beyond, the skirmisher cavalry were a well-known and highly valued as a light and mobile unit.

After the successful and effective deployment of these horsemen by both the English and Scottish during the Scottish Wars of Independence. Belligerents in continental conflicts also began to hire Irish and Scottish Gaels as mercenary troops for their armies. Both the English and French hired these Gaelic horsemen and both eventually duplicated the concept themselves. Hobelars were principally utilized in engagements during the Scottish Wars of Independence and Hundred Years War. After time the Hobelars slowly adapted from mounted skirmishers much like kern into a more basic form of light cavalry. On the continent, from 1311 on continental Hobelars became more and more armored and less distinguishable from other cavalry units.

In Scotland, Hobelars served as the offensive arm of castle garrisons. Hobelars were utilized as raiders across the border by both the English and Scots, they can be viewed as early predecessors to the reivers and moss-troopers of the Scottish borderlands.

Later Weaponry

During the late Middle Ages and Renaissance period, weapon imports from Europe influenced Gaelic weapon design. Take for example the German Zweihänder sword, a long double-handed weapon used for quick, powerful cuts and thrusts. Irish swords were copied from these models, which had unique furnishings. Many, for example, often featured open rings on the pommel. On any locally designed Irish sword in the Middle Ages, this meant you could see the end of the tang go through the pommel and cap the end. These swords were often of very fine construction and quality. Scottish swords continued to use the more traditional "V" cross-guards that had been on pre-Norse Gaelic swords, culminating in such pieces as the now famous "claymore" design. This was an outgrowth of numerous earlier designs, and has become a symbol of Scotland. The claymore was used together with the typical axes of the Gallowglass until the 18th century, but began to be replaced by pistols, muskets and basket-hilted swords, which were shorter versions of the claymore which were used with one hand in conjunction with a shield. 
These basket-hilted broadswords are still a symbol of Scotland to this day, as is the typical small round shield known as a "targe."

Redshanks

Redshank was a nickname for Scottish or Ulster mercenaries from the Highlands and Western Isles contracted to fight in Ireland; they were a prominent feature of Irish armies throughout the 16th century. They were called redshanks because similarly to the Irish they went dressed in plaids and waded bare-legged through rivers in the coldest weather. The term was not derogatory however, as the English were in general impressed with the redshanks' qualities as soldiers.

The redshanks were usually armed alike, principally with bows (the short bow of Scotland and Ireland, rather than the longbow of Wales and England) and, initially, two-handed weapons like claymores, battle axes or Lochaber axes. English observers reported that some Highlanders fighting in Ireland wore chain mail, long obsolete elsewhere.

Later in the period, they may have adopted the targe and single-handed broadsword, a style of weaponry originally fashionable in early 16th-century Spain from where its use could have spread to Ireland. Combined with the use of muskets, this could have influenced the development of what was later referred to as the "highland charge", a tactic of firing a single coordinated musket volley before closing at a run with sword and targe. Many Gaelic clan levies, called Caterans, would have remained relatively poorly armed.

By the mid-17th century, a large number of Scottish Highlanders, also often called "redshanks", fought in the Irish Confederate Wars, notably the clansmen serving under Alasdair Mac Colla, himself a member of a minor Hebridean branch of Clan Donald (a cadet family of Clan MacDonald of Dunnyveg). However, the Highlanders who fought at the Battle of Dungan's Hill and Battle of Knocknanuss were to be the last of the redshanks. 

The subsequent Cromwellian conquest and Williamite War brought an end to Irish employment of Scottish Highland mercenaries through the destruction of their employers, the Gaelic nobility and by the pacification of the Scottish Gaels with the Statutes of Iona and the Highland clearances.

List of Gaelic conflicts and battles
This is a list of battles or conflicts in which the Gaels had a leading or crucial role.

See also 
Gaels
Gaelic Ireland
Celtic warfare
Ceithearn (Kern)
Ceathairne (Cateran)
Gallóglaigh (Gallowglass)
Hobelar
Fianna
Redshank
Military History
Warfare in Medieval Scotland

Notes

References 
 G. A. Hayes-McCoy, "Strategy and Tactics in Irish Warfare, 1593–1601". Irish Historical Studies, Vol. 2, No. 7 (Mar. 1941), pp. 255–279
 Fergus Cannan, "'HAGS OF HELL': late medieval Irish kern". History Ireland, Vol. 19, No. 1 (January/February 2011), pp. 14–17
 The Barbarians, Terry Jones
Julius Caesar, "De Bello Gallico"
"Tain Bo Cuailnge", From the Book of Leinster
Geoffrey Keating, "History of Ireland"
"The Wars of the Gaels with the Foreigners"
http://www.myarmoury.com/feature_armies_irish.html
http://www.myarmoury.com/feature_armies_scots.html

Celtic warfare
Warfare
Warfare of the Middle Ages
Military history of Ireland